RanBP-type and C3HC4-type zinc finger-containing protein 1 (also known as HOIL-1) is a protein that in humans is encoded by the RBCK1 gene.

The protein encoded by this gene is similar to mouse UIP28/UbcM4 interacting protein. Alternative splicing has been observed at this locus, resulting in distinct isoforms.

HOIL-1 is an E3 ubiquitin ligase and a part of the linear ubiquitin chain assembly complex (LUBAC), the only known ubiquitin ligase generating linear (Met1) polyubiquitin linkages. Although HOIL-1 isn’t responsible for the linear ubiquitin generation, it is a necessary component of LUBAC and ensures its proper assembly and function. Interestingly, unlike most E3 ubiquitin ligases, HOIL-1 is able to catalyze oxyester bond formation between the C-terminus of a ubiquitin monomer and Ser/Thr of a different protein. This recently discovered function of HOIL-1 has so far been described in the context of MyD88 signaling. Additionally, a catalytically inactive mutant of HOIL-1 (HOIL-1C458S) led to prolonged IKK activation and increase of inflammatory cytokine production by cytotoxic T cells. The proposed mechanism is that the ester-linked ubiquitin chains limit the size of isopeptide-linked (K63 and/or M1) ubiquitin chains.

Clinical significance 

A family quartet was found with two children, both affected with a previously unreported disease, characterized by progressive muscular weakness and cardiomyopathy, with normal intelligence. During the course of the study, one additional unrelated patient was found with a comparable phenotype. From whole-genome sequence data,  RBCK1, a gene encoding an E3 ubiquitin-protein ligase, was identified as the most likely candidate gene, with two protein-truncating mutations in probands in the first family. Sanger sequencing identified a private homozygous splice variant in RBCK1 in the proband in the second family, yet single-nucleotide polymorphism (SNP) genotyping revealed a 1.2Mb copy-neutral region of homozygosity covering RBCK1. RNA-Seq confirmed aberrant splicing of RBCK1 transcripts, resulting in truncated protein products. Ten other individuals with mutations in RBCK1 and overlapping phenotypes have been identified.

References

Further reading